Lair of the Freebooters is a 1983 role-playing game adventure for Thieves' Guild published by Gamelords.

Contents
Lair of the Freebooters is a supplement which depicts an adventure setting under threat of piracy.

Publication history
Lair of the Freebooters was written by Janet Trautvetter, Kerry Lloyd, and Kevin Hardwick, and was published by Gamelords in 1983 as a 48-page book.

Reception
Chris Hunter reviewed Lair of the Freebooters for Imagine magazine, and stated that "I have no great desire to bring pirates into my AD&D games but if you do, LotF plus TG6 for ship to ship combat rules etc are a good place to start."

Rick Swan reviewed Lair of the Freebooters in Space Gamer No. 73. Swan commented that "Although it's well-presented, roleplayers who've been around awhile have probably run across much of this elsewhere and will find more of the same here. Those with an insatiable taste for the high seas, however, will want to check out the sections on ship weaponry, naval tactics, and crew skills."

References

Fantasy role-playing game adventures
Role-playing game supplements introduced in 1983
Thieves' Guild (role-playing game)